The surname Punch may refer to:

 Gary Punch (born 1957), Australian politician
 Jerry Punch (born 1953), American auto racing and college football commentator
 John Punch (slave) (fl. 1630s), supposedly the first official slave in the English colonies
 John Punch (theologian), 1603–1661), Irish Franciscan scholastic philosopher and theologian 
 Leon Punch (1928–1991), Australian politician
 Lucy Punch (born 1977), English actress
 Sean Punch (born 1967), Canadian writer and game designer